The Roads and Highways Department is an agency of the Government of Bangladesh responsible for the construction and maintenance of highways and bridges across Bangladesh. The Department is a subsidiary of the Road Transport and Highways Division, a Division of the Ministry of Road Transport and Bridges.

History
Roads and Highways Department was established in 1962 after the Construction & Building organisation was broken into two, the other being Public Works Department. The department is responsible for the construction of roads, highways, and bridges and their upkeep. It also has a broader plan to replace ferry routes with bridges.

References

Transport organisations based in Bangladesh
Organisations based in Dhaka
Government departments of Bangladesh
Bangladesh
1962 establishments in East Pakistan